Evren Korkmaz (born 27 April 1997) is a Turkish professional footballer who plays as a defender for Turkish club Adanaspor.

Club career
Born in Venlo to Turkish parents, Korkmaz made his professional debut in the Eerste Divisie for VVV-Venlo on 1 April 2016 in a game against FC Den Bosch as a substitute for Sam Westley.

Honours

Club
VVV-Venlo
Eerste Divisie: 2016–17

References

External links
 
 

Living people
1997 births
Footballers from Venlo
Association football defenders
Dutch footballers
Dutch people of Turkish descent
VVV-Venlo players
Eredivisie players
Eerste Divisie players